Hugh John Macdonald (born 31 January 1940 in Newbury, Berkshire) is an English musicologist chiefly known for his work within the music of the 19th century, especially in France. He has been general editor of the Hector Berlioz: New Edition of the Complete Works since its inception in 1967 and has been particularly active in the revival of interest in Berlioz's music. He is also the author of several entries within The Grove Dictionary of Music and Musicians.

Biography
Macdonald studied under Raymond Leppard at the University of Cambridge from 1958–1966. He went on to pursue doctoral studies, earning a Ph.D. in 1969 from Cambridge after researching the music of Berlioz for a dissertation consisting of a critical edition of Les Troyens. He served on the faculty of music at Cambridge from 1966 to 1971 and on the music faculty at University of Oxford from 1971 to 1980. He became the Gardiner Professor of Music at Glasgow University in 1980, where he remained until 1987, when he was appointed Avis Blewett Professor of Music at Washington University in St. Louis.

Works 

 2019: 
 2014: 
 1967-:

Articles

Notes

Sources
 "Hugh Mcdonald" (archived copy), from Washington University in St. Louis.

English musicologists
1940 births
Living people
Washington University in St. Louis faculty
Academics of the University of Glasgow
Academics of the University of Oxford
Alumni of the University of Cambridge
British expatriates in the United States
Berlioz scholars